Circotettix is a genus of band-winged grasshoppers in the family Acrididae. There are about 9 described species in Circotettix.

Species
 Circotettix carlinianus (Thomas, 1870) (carlinian snapper)
 Circotettix coconino Rehn, 1921 (coconino wrangler grasshopper)
 Circotettix crotalum Rehn, 1921 (rattling grasshopper)
 Circotettix maculatus Scudder, 1881 (dancing grasshopper)
 Circotettix rabula Rehn & Hebard, 1906 (wrangler grasshopper)
 Circotettix shastanus Bruner, 1889 (Shasta grasshopper)
 Circotettix stenometopus (Strohecker & Buxton, 1963)
 Circotettix strepitus (Rehn, 1921)
 Circotettix undulatus (Thomas, 1872) (undulant-winged grasshopper)

References

Further reading

 
 
 
 
 
 

Oedipodinae